Witches' Night may refer to:

 Witches' Night (1927 film), German silent film
 Witches' Night (1937 film), Swedish film